The Drevani ( or Drevanen) were a tribe of Polabian Slavs settling on the Elbe river in the area of the present-day Lüchow-Dannenberg district of Lower Saxony, Germany.

They were a constituent tribe of the Obodrite confederacy. In the course of the 9th century their territory was conquered by the Carolingian Empire and incorporated into the Duchy of Saxony. According to the Royal Frankish Annals, Emperor Charlemagne had a fortress built at Höhbeck.

The lands where the Drevani lived is today also known as the Wendland, named after the Wends. The local Slavic language (Polabian) died out in the mid-18th century. The name Drevani means "people of woods/trees" in Polabian (from drevo "tree"). It has survived in the name of the Drawehn hills.

References
 Heydzianka-Piłatowa J., Przebieg wynarodowienia Drzewian połabskich w świetle kroniki chłopskiej Jana Parum Schulzego, "Studia z Filologii Polskiej i Słowiańskiej" XIX, 1980, s. 131-136.
 Firckse, A., Die preussische Bevölkerung nach ihrer Muttersprache, "Zeitschrift des königlich-preußischen staatlichen Bureaus" 1893, Bd. XXXIII.
 Polański K., Problem różnic gwarowych w języku połabskim, "Studia z Filologii Polskiej i Słowiańskiej" V, 1965, s. 365-369.
 Rost P., Die Sprachreste der Draväno-Polaben im Hannöverschen, Leipzig 1907.
 Salmer W., Sprachstudien im Lüneburger Wendland, s. 6 i n.
 Muka, A., Szczątki języka połabskiego Wendów Luneburskich, [in:] Materiały i prace Komisyi językowej Akademii Umiejętności w Krakowie, t. I, Kraków 1904, s. 313-569.

Obotrites
History of Lower Saxony
Extinct languages of Europe